CRJ may refer to:

 Bombardier CRJ (Canadair Regional Jet), a family of Canadian commercial jet aircraft
 CRJ100/200/440, 50 seats
 CRJ700/900/1000, 70–100 seats
 Air Cruzal, Angola (ICAO airline designator CRJ)
 Carly Rae Jepsen, Canadian Pop Singer